Girl Disrupted is the debut studio album by American recording artist Sevyn Streeter. The album was released on July 7, 2017, through Atlantic Records. The album was preceded by the release of three singles—"My Love for You", "Before I Do" and "Fallen".

The album charted at number thirty-six on the Billboard 200 and number forty-four on the Top R&B/Hip-Hop Albums chart.

Background and promotion
On March 9, 2015, the album's title was announced as On the Verge via Streeter's Instagram account, "ON THE VERGE the moment before something great happens… you can feel it! This album is my "something great". My thoughts, desires, fears, tears, emotional ups, downs, good times, drunken nights and unforgettable memories all rolled up into on body of work." On November 29, 2016, Streeter announced a preliminary release date and the title for Girl Disrupted, scheduled to be January 27, 2017. The title is a reference and a nod to the 1999 psychological drama film Girl, Interrupted with, as Streeter says, "this crazy industry" as a stand-in for the bizarre cast of characters at the movie's mental hospital: "I love that movie and always watch it in bed. But one night, for some reason, the story connected to me in a different way. It was like, ‘God, that's me and this crazy music industry.’ I'm not interrupted — just ‘disrupted.’"

On January 19, 2017, in an interview with Hip Hop Weekly, she revealed the collaborations on the album: "I have a record with August Alsina called 'Been A Minute,' I have a record with Ty Dolla $ign called 'Fallen,' I have a record with Dave East, I got a record with Jeremih, and I got a couple of more surprises imma keep in my back pocket." On June 7, 2017, Streeter announced the release date of the album along with the artwork via her Instagram account. The following day the track listing was announced.

Singles
"My Love for You" was released as the album's lead single on September 16, 2016, with the music video premiering three days later on September 19, 2016.

"Before I Do" was released as the album's second single on December 2, 2016. The music video was released on December 5, 2016. The song peaked at number fifteen on the Billboard R&B/Hip-Hop Airplay and number one on the Adult R&B Songs chart week beginning July 1, 2017.

"Fallen" featuring Ty Dolla $ign and Cam Wallace was released as the album's third single on January 27, 2017. The music video was released on January 30, 2017.

Original singles
"Prolly" featuring rapper Gucci Mane was released on August 12, 2016. The music video was released on August 15, 2016. The song entered the R&B/Hip-Hop Airplay chart at number fifty on October 8, 2016.

"D4L" featuring The-Dream was released on October 14, 2016. The music video was released on October 17, 2016. The remixes were released on January 13, 2017.

Neither of these singles appeared on the album. promotional cd’s included them for performances.

Tour
On November 15, 2016, the 18-date Sevyn Streeter Girl Disrupted Tour was announced to promote Girl Disrupted, which began on January 12, 2017, in St. Louis, Missouri and finished on February 12, 2017, at The Roxy in Los Angeles.

Commercial performance
The album debuted at number ninety-two on the Billboard 200 albums chart, number thirteen on the R&B Albums chart and number forty-four on the Top R&B/Hip-Hop Albums chart in its first week with 4,351 units sold.

Track listing

Charts

Release history

References

External links
 

Albums produced by Bangladesh (record producer)
Albums produced by Da Internz
Albums produced by Sean Garrett
Albums produced by The-Dream
Albums produced by Tricky Stewart
Atlantic Records albums
2017 debut albums
Sevyn Streeter albums